The 1993 Tour de France was the 80th edition of the Tour de France, taking place from 3 to 25 July.

The winner of the previous two years, Miguel Induráin, successfully defended his title. The points classification was won by Djamolidine Abdoujaparov, while the mountains classification was won by Tony Rominger.

Teams

The organisers of the Tour, Amaury Sport Organisation (ASO), felt that it was no longer safe to have 198 cyclists in the race, as more and more traffic islands had been made, so the total number of teams was reduced from 22 to 20, composing of 9 cyclists. The first 14 teams were selected in May 1993, based on the FICP ranking. In June 1993, six additional wildcards were given; one of which was given to a combination of two teams,  and Subaru. The Subaru team did not want to be part of a mixed team, so Chazal was allowed to send a full team.

The teams entering the race were:

Qualified teams

Invited teams

Pre-race favourites

The defending champion Miguel Induráin was the big favourite, having won the 1993 Giro d'Italia earlier that year.

Route and stages

The route was unveiled in October 1992. Most team directors expected it to be more difficult than the 1992 Tour de France.

Race overview

The 1993 Tour started in the same way as the 1992 Tour: Indurain won, with Alex Zülle in second place. The next stages were flat, and all finished in mass sprints. After the second stage, sprinter Wilfried Nelissen had collected enough time bonuses to become leader in the general classification.

The team time trial in stage four was the first stage with significant effects on the general classification. Banesto (Indurain's team) came in seventh, losing more than one minute, but the biggest loser was Tony Rominger, whose Clas team lost more than three minutes.

The contenders for the overall victory saved their energy in the next few stages, and cyclists who would not be a threat in the mountains were allowed to break away, with only the sprinters' teams trying to get them back. The sixth stage was run with an average speed of almost , at that moment the fastest mass-start stage in the Tour.

In the ninth stage, an individual time trial, the general classification changed. Indurain was a lot faster than the other cyclists, winning the stage with a margin of more than two minutes, and became the new leader in the general classification.

The next stages were in the Alps. Tony Rominger attacked, trying to win back time. Although he was able to win the stage, Indurain had followed him closely, so Rominger did not win back any time. Other pre-race favourites lost considerable time this stage and were no longer in contention, such as Claudio Chiappucci, who lost more than eight minutes.

In the eleventh stage, Rominger tried it again. But again, Indurain stayed with him. Rominger won the stage again, but the margin to Indurain stayed the same. Rominger did jump to fourth place in the general classification, because Erik Breukink lost almost ten minutes.

The next three stages were relatively flat, and the top of the general classification stayed the same. In the fifteenth stage, Pyrenean climbs were included. The stage was won by Oliverio Rincón, the only survivor of an early breakaway. Behind him, Rominger again tried to get away from Indurain, but was unable to do so.

In the sixteenth stage, again in the Pyrenées, Rominger was finally able to get away from Indurain, but the margin was only three seconds. The seventeenth stage was the last stage with serious climbs, so the last realistic opportunity to win back time on Indurain, but this did not happen, so it seemed certain that Indurain would become the winner.

The rest of the podium was determined in the individual time trial in stage 19. It was won by Rominger, with Indurain in second place. Rominger thus climbed to the second place in the general classification.

Classification leadership and minor prizes

There were several classifications in the 1993 Tour de France. The most important was the general classification, calculated by adding each cyclist's finishing times on each stage. The cyclist with the least accumulated time was the race leader, identified by the yellow jersey; the winner of this classification is considered the winner of the Tour.

Additionally, there was a points classification, which awarded a green jersey. In the points classification, cyclists got points for finishing among the best in a stage finish, or in intermediate sprints. The cyclist with the most points lead the classification, and was identified with a green jersey.

There was also a mountains classification. The organisation had categorised some climbs as either hors catégorie, first, second, third, or fourth-category; points for this classification were won by the first cyclists that reached the top of these climbs first, with more points available for the higher-categorised climbs. The cyclist with the most points lead the classification, and wore a white jersey with red polka dots.

The fourth individual classification was the young rider classification, which was not marked by a jersey. This was decided the same way as the general classification, but only riders under 26 years were eligible.

For the team classification, the times of the best three cyclists per team on each stage were added; the leading team was the team with the lowest total time.

In addition, there was a combativity award given after each mass-start stage to the cyclist considered most combative. The decision was made by a jury composed of journalists who gave points. The cyclist with the most points from votes in all stages led the combativity classification. Massimo Ghirotto won this classification, and was given overall the super-combativity award. The Souvenir Henri Desgrange was given in honour of Tour founder Henri Desgrange to the first rider to pass the summit of the Col du Galibier on stage 10. This prize was won by Tony Rominger. The fair-play award was given to Gianni Bugno.

In stage 1, Alex Zülle wore the green jersey.
In stages 3, 4, and 6, Mario Cipollini wore the green jersey.

Final standings

General classification

Points classification

Mountains classification

Young rider classification

Team classification

Combativity classification

Notes

References

Bibliography

Further reading

External links

 
1993 in road cycling
1993 in French sport
1993
July 1993 sports events in Europe